Nicholas James Fradiani IV (born November 15, 1985) is an American singer from Guilford, Connecticut. He rose to regional attention as the lead singer of pop/rock band Beach Avenue when they won the Battle of the Bands at Mohegan Sun in 2011. He gained national recognition in 2014 when he competed on the ninth season of the reality talent show America's Got Talent, although he only made it to "Judgment Week".

In 2015, Fradiani entered as a solo singer on the fourteenth season of American Idol. Fradiani won the show in May 2015, becoming the first winner from the Northeast region. He released an album, Hurricane, with Big Machine Label Group in August 2016. He has subsequently released a six-song EP in fall 2017, as an indie artist and toured with The Alternate Routes.

Early life and education
Fradiani was born on November 15, 1985 in New Haven, Connecticut. He is the son of Nick Fradiani III, a musician who, as of 2016, regularly performs at Water's Edge Resort and Spa, as well as in clubs and restaurants, and on cruise ships, and Elizabeth Fradiani (née Maher). He is of three quarters Italian and one quarter Irish descent. His father gave his son a drum set when he was two years old, and encouraged him to learn to play piano and later guitar. Fradiani has a sister, Kristen, who was born a day before his sixth birthday on November 14, 1991. Kristen and their paternal cousins Jamie and Nicole attend Southern Connecticut State University. Their paternal cousin, Dean Fradiani Jr., son of the elder Nick's late brother Dean Fradiani Sr., is the owner of Fradiani Landscaping, LLC, in East Haven.

Fradiani graduated from Guilford High School in 2004.

Fradiani has a bachelor's degree in history from Wheaton College, Norton, Massachusetts. He intermittently worked as a substitute teacher at schools while mainly focusing on picking up gigs at local bars wherever he could. He also briefly held a daytime job as a computer software salesman.

Music career

2011-14: Beach Avenue
Fradiani rose to regional attention as the lead singer of Milford, Connecticut-based pop/rock band Beach Avenue when they won the Battle of the Bands at Mohegan Sun in 2011. The five-member band released original materials including the Something to Believe In EP in June 2012 and Driving That Road EP in July 2013. In 2014, they released two singles: "Coming Your Way" and "Feel the Beat."

The members of the band are:
 Nick Fradiani, IV – lead vocals and guitar
 Nick Abraham – lead guitar, mandoline, and backing vocals
 Nick Fradiani, III (Fradiani's father) – keyboards and backing vocals
 Jonah Ferrigno – bass
 Ryan Zipp – drums

Three members of the band, Fradiani, Abraham and Zipp, gained national recognition 2014 when they competed on the ninth season of the reality talent show America's Got Talent, singing their original song "Coming Your Way". Fradiani cites singing the original song on the show as his "biggest career break". The audition was aired on NBC in July 2014, and the song reached #53 on the iTunes Pop Singles Chart; it sold 6,000 copies in the first week after the televised audition. All four judges voted "yes" for the band to go to the next round. The band made it to "Judgement Week", broadcast on July 22 and 23, where they played another of their original songs titled "Feel the Beat" before elimination from the competition. "Coming Your Way" remained in the Top 200 for over two weeks, selling more than 10,000 copies.

2015: American Idol
Fradiani auditioned in New York City and his golden ticket song was Peter Gabriel's "In Your Eyes". During Hollywood Week, he sang "Babylon" by David Gray. He sang Train's "Drops of Jupiter (Tell Me)" during the House of Blues Showcase, earning his spot in the Top 24. He was announced as the winner on May 13, 2015, with Clark Beckham finishing as runner-up. Fradiani's winning song was "Beautiful Life", recorded on Big Machine label. "Beautiful Life" was the FIFA 2015 Women's World Cup official anthem. Fradiani headlined the American Idols LIVE! Tour 2015, a thirty-seven city tour over eight weeks featuring the top five contestants.

Performances

2015-2017: Hurricane
Following Fradiani's Idol win, his label offered a non-target PledgeMusic campaign for pre-orders and merchandise sales. During the six weeks before the start of the American Idols LIVE! tour, Fradiani played a number of radio-sponsored concerts, and worked on new songs with writers including Paul Doucette. In September, following the end of the tour, work on the new album intensified, although Fradiani also played shows including Live in the Vineyard and Connecticut's All-Star Christmas, where Rob Thomas invited Fradiani to join him in singing "Bright Lights." Fradiani was also one of the American Idol alumni who represented the show at the winter Television Critics Association panel.

On February 12, 2016, Fradiani appeared on American Idol to mentor and duet with Top 24 contestants Thomas Stringfellow and Gianna Isabella. As part of the mentoring packaging with Isabella, the show aired a brief clip of Fradiani's upcoming single, "Get You Home," which he co-wrote with Nolan Sipe, Jaden Michaels, and Rykeyz; it was mixed by Grammy winner Serban Ghenea. The same night, Fradiani shared a longer excerpt, which included a sample of Young MC's "Busta Move." In an interview with Ralphie Aversa during Backstage at the Grammys, Fradiani described "Get You Home" as "the most up-tempo, funkiest song on the whole album." In multiple interviews, he mentioned that he co-wrote every song on the album, for which recording was completed in early February.

In a live Facebook chat on February 24, Fradiani revealed that "Get You Home" would be released on March 11, 2016. As a treat for fans, the release date was shifted to March 10, which coincided with the debut live performance on American Idol. A video was shot on March 29 in Chicago, at Virgin Hotels Chicago, with model Michelle Hicks as the female lead. It was directed by Erik White and used real hotel guests as extras. Released on May 19, 2016, the video shows Fradiani having a "cat and mouse game" encounter, starting at the hotel's bar, with a beautiful woman who appears to have no scruples, leading to a steamy night at the hotel and a surprise resolution.

In an interview with Boston's Mix 104.1 on May 5, 2016, Fradiani revealed the album's title of Hurricane, to be released on August 5, 2016, named after a track co-written with Jason Mraz and with Fradiani's Beach Avenue guitarist, Nick Abraham. Fradiani and Abraham gave the first performance of "Hurricane" (acoustic) at the B93 Big Summer Show in Modesto, California, on June 10, 2016.

Starting in late May 2016, Fradiani also released snippets of the recorded versions of various songs from the album, sometimes accompanied by "behind the songs" videos. The album Hurricane was released on August 5, 2016, and debuted at #1 on Billboards Heatseekers chart.

A second single, "All On You," was released on August 5, 2016. On December 15, Billboard provided the exclusive premiere of a stark, black-and-white performance video for the song, shot at New Haven's historic Lyric Hall by Ryan Zipp. In the same feature, Fradiani confirmed that the next single would be "Love Is Blind," to be released in January 2017, with a video to follow around Valentine's Day.

In January 2017, Fradiani parted with Big Machine Label Group and 19 Entertainment. The official video for "Love Is Blind" was released on January 23, 2017. It shows Fradiani surprising a bride and groom by performing the song for their first dance together as a married couple.

2017-present: Where We Left Off 
After parting ways with Big Machine, Fradiani began work on a new EP, Where We Left Off, which was released on October 13, 2017. A return to a more organic style, the six-song EP was written entirely with Beach Avenue lead guitarist Nick Abraham. Two additional Connecticut singer-songwriters, Stephen Kellogg and Coley O'Toole, also collaborated on the tracks "I'll Wait for You" and "Run Away," respectively. Of making the EP, Fradiani said: " I wrote everything, co-produced everything, and I think you can really hear me in the music, it's a little more organic sounding. We tried to use a lot of real stringed instruments and played everything, and it was a cool experience."

The lead single for the EP was "I'll Wait for You," of which Pop, Rinse, Repeat said: "If you're not tapping your foot along with him by about 12 seconds, I don't know if there's hope for you in the happiness department." On May 4, 2018, Fradiani released an acoustic version of the EP's third track, "Scared," rearranged with Eric Donnelly from The Alternate Routes. Fradiani had co-headlined a tour with The Alternate Routes during the summer and fall of 2017. Fradiani portrays Lorenzo Anello in a national tour of A Bronx Tale.

Discography

Studio albums
Solo

EPs
As solo artist

As part of Beach Avenue

Singles

Beach Avenue

Solo

Other songs
2013: "Father and Son" (Nick Fradiani Sr. featuring Nick Fradiani Jr.)
2016: "Hallelujah" (Nick Fradiani Jr. featuring Nick Fradiani Sr.)

See also
List of Idols winners

References

External links
Official site
Nick Fradiani VEVO
Nick Fradiani on YouTube
Nick Fradiani on Spotify

1985 births
Living people
21st-century American singers
American Idol participants
American Idol winners
American people of Irish descent
American people of Italian descent
People from Guilford, Connecticut
Wheaton College (Massachusetts) alumni
21st-century American male singers